Voloshyne may refer to the following places in Ukraine:

Voloshyne, Crimea
Voloshyne, Zhytomyr Oblast